The 1989 UCI Road World Cup was the first edition of the UCI Road World Cup.

Races

Final standings

Riders

Teams

References

 Complete results from Cyclingbase.com 
 Final classification for individuals and teams from memoire-du-cyclisme.net

 
 
UCI Road World Cup (men)